Towner County is a county in the U.S. state of North Dakota. As of the 2020 census, the population is 2,162. Its county seat is Cando. It is south of the Canada–US border with Manitoba.

History
The Dakota Territory legislature created the county on March 8, 1883, with areas partitioned from Cavalier and Rolette counties. It was named for Oscar M. Towner (1842–1897), a businessman and member of the 15th territorial legislature. The county organization was not completed at that time, and the county was attached to Pembina County for judicial and administrative purposes. That lasted until January 24, 1884, when the county organization was effected, and its attachment to Pembina was dissolved. However, on January 26, 1889, the county was attached to Ramsey County for judicial and administrative purposes. This arrangement only lasted a few months. The boundaries of Towner County as first formed have not been altered to the present (as of 2019).

The city of Towner, North Dakota, is in McHenry County.

Geography
Towner County lies on the north line of North Dakota, and thus on the north line of the continental United States. Its north boundary line abuts the south boundary line of Canada. Its terrain consists of rolling hills, dotted with lakes and ponds. The area is devoted to agriculture. The Laurentian Divide runs across Towner County - the northern terrain slopes to the north while the southern terrain slopes to the south, and the county as a whole slightly slopes to the east.

Towner County, North Dakota Weather Data

Averages use 1901-2000  

Records are from 1895-Present

Major highways

  U.S. Route 281
  North Dakota Highway 5
  North Dakota Highway 17
  North Dakota Highway 66

Adjacent counties and rural municipalities

 Municipality of Killarney-Turtle Mountain, Manitoba - northwest
 Cartwright-Roblin Municipality, Manitoba - north
 Municipality of Louise, Manitoba - northeast
 Cavalier County - east
 Ramsey County - southeast
 Benson County - south
 Pierce County - southwest
 Rolette County - west

National protected areas

 Brumba National Wildlife Refuge
 Lake Alice National Wildlife Refuge (part)
 Rock Lake National Wildlife Refuge
 Snyder Lake National Wildlife Refuge

Lakes

 Armourdale Lake
 Brumba Pool
 Lake Alice (part)
 McLaughlin Lake
 Moore Lake
 Pound Lake
 Rock Lake
 Snyder Lake

Demographics

2000 census
As of the 2000 census, there were 2,876 people, 1,218 households, and 785 families in the county. The population density was 2.8/sqmi (1.08/km2). There were 1,558 housing units at an average density of 1.52/sqmi (0.59/km2). The racial makeup of the county was 97.32% White, 0.07% Black or African American, 2.05% Native American, 0.07% Asian, 0.03% from other races, and 0.45% from two or more races. 0.17% of the population were Hispanic or Latino of any race. 35.1% were of German and 31.0% Norwegian ancestry. 98.4% spoke English as their first language.

There were 1,218 households, out of which 27.30% had children under the age of 18 living with them, 56.90% were married couples living together, 4.60% had a female householder with no husband present, and 35.50% were non-families. 33.60% of all households were made up of individuals, and 18.70% had someone living alone who was 65 years of age or older. The average household size was 2.31 and the average family size was 2.93.

The county population contained 24.60% under the age of 18, 3.60% from 18 to 24, 24.00% from 25 to 44, 24.50% from 45 to 64, and 23.30% who were 65 years of age or older. The median age was 44 years. For every 100 females there were 97.00 males. For every 100 females age 18 and over, there were 96.00 males.

The median income for a household in the county was $32,740, and the median income for a family was $39,286. Males had a median income of $24,917 versus $17,335 for females. The per capita income for the county was $17,605.  About 6.30% of families and 8.90% of the population were below the poverty line, including 9.20% of those under age 18 and 8.80% of those age 65 or over.

2010 census
As of the 2010 census, there were 2,246 people, 1,048 households, and 639 families in the county. The population density was 2.19/sqmi (0.85/km2). There were 1,449 housing units at an average density of 1.41/sqmi (0.55/km2). The racial makeup of the county was 96.7% white, 2.2% American Indian, 0.1% black or African American, 0.3% from other races, and 0.7% from two or more races. Those of Hispanic or Latino origin made up 0.4% of the population. In terms of ancestry, 46.5% were German, 41.5% were Norwegian, 10.4% were Irish, 7.4% were English, 5.5% were Swedish, and 3.2% were American.

Of the 1,048 households, 22.2% had children under the age of 18 living with them, 51.5% were married couples living together, 6.0% had a female householder with no husband present, 39.0% were non-families, and 36.4% of all households were made up of individuals. The average household size was 2.10 and the average family size was 2.71. The median age was 50.3 years.

The median income for a household in the county was $43,684 and the median income for a family was $54,609. Males had a median income of $36,350 versus $26,164 for females. The per capita income for the county was $24,203. About 8.5% of families and 10.3% of the population were below the poverty line, including 17.1% of those under age 18 and 9.7% of those age 65 or over.

Communities

Cities

 Bisbee
 Cando (county seat)
 Egeland
 Hansboro
 Perth
 Rocklake
 Sarles (mostly in Cavalier County)

Unincorporated communities
 Agate
 Maza
 Olmstead

Townships

 Armourdale
 Atkins
 Bethel
 Cando
 Coolin
 Crocus
 Dash
 Gerrard
 Grainfield
 Howell
 Lansing
 Maza
 Monroe
 Mount View
 New City
 Olson
 Paulson
 Picton
 Rock Lake
 Sidney
 Smith
 Sorenson
 Springfield
 Teddy
 Twin Hill
 Victor
 Virginia
 Zion

Politics

Education
School districts include:
 Leeds Public School District 6
 Mount Pleasant Public School District 4
 Munich Public School District 19
 North Star School District
 Starkweather Public School District 44

Former school districts:
 Bisbee-Egeland School District - Formed in 1980 with the merger of the Bisbee and Egeland districts, known as West Central School District 12 and East Central School District 12, respectively. Merged into North Star Schools in 2008.
 Cando School District - Merged into North Star Schools in 2008.
 North Central Public School District 28

See also
 National Register of Historic Places listings in Towner County, North Dakota

References

External links
 Towner County official website
 Towner County map, North Dakota DOT

 
1884 establishments in Dakota Territory
Populated places established in 1884